Religia.tv was a religious television channel owned by ITI Group. It was launched on October 15, 2007, at 12:00. In December 2014, it was announced that the broadcasting of Religia.tv would be ended on January 31, 2015.

See also
Wiesław Dawidowski

References

External links
 Official Site 

Defunct television channels in Poland
Television channels and stations established in 2007
Television channels and stations disestablished in 2015
2007 establishments in Poland
2015 disestablishments in Poland